K55 or K-55 may refer to:

 K-55 (Kansas highway)
 K-55 (missile), a Soviet air-to-air missile
 K55 howitzer, a South Korean self-propelled gun
 , a corvette of the Royal Navy
 Keystone K-55 Pronto, an American biplane
 Osan Air Base, in South Korea
 Potassium-55, an isotope of potassium
 , various vessels
 K-55, a Billiard table profile